Patrizia Ragno (born 15 June 1972) is a former Italian female long-distance runner who competed at one edition of the IAAF World Cross Country Championships at senior level (1996), and two of the IAAF World Half Marathon Championships (1996, 1997).

References

External links

1972 births
Living people
Italian female long-distance runners
Italian female cross country runners